Events from the year 1949 in Pakistan.

Incumbents

Federal government
Governor-General: Khawaja Nazimuddin
Prime Minister: Liaquat Ali Khan
Chief Justice: Abdul Rashid (starting 27 June)

Governors
 Governor of Northwest Frontier: Ambrose Dundas Flux Dundas (until 19 July); Sahibzada Mohammad Khurshid (starting 19 July)
 
 Governor of West Punjab: Francis Mudie (until 2 August); Abdur Rab Nishtar (starting 2 August) 
 Governor of Sindh: Shaikh Din Muhammad (until 19 November); Mian Aminuddin (starting 19 November)

Events

January

 1 January – The UN brokered a cease-fire in Kashmir. It granted Kashmir the right to vote on whether to join Pakistan or India.

March
 Pakistan and India sign the Karachi Agreement

Births
16 March – Shaukat Aziz, former prime minister
15 September – Taskeen Manerwal, poet and writer (d. 2022)
25 December – Nawaz Sharif, former prime minister

Deaths
 19 June – Syed Zafarul Hasan, Muslim philosopher (b. 1885)

See also
 1948 in Pakistan
 Other events of 1949
 1950 in Pakistan
 List of Pakistani films before 1950
 Timeline of Pakistani history

 
1949 in Asia